The 1980 Fiji rugby union tour of Argentina was a series of matches played between October and November by the Fiji national rugby union team in Argentina.

It was the first visit of a rugby union team from Polynesia to Argentina.

Results 

Argentina "B": G.Verano; A.Puccio, G.Sanguinetti, G.Lorenzo, E.Sanguinetti; J.Piccardo (capt.), A.Nicholson; G.Milano, O.Bracaccini, G.Antonini (G.García) M.Glestra, E.Bronca; J.Aguilar (Crevero), J.Prez Coba, C.Sainz Trápaga. Fiji S.Vuetaki; S.Laulau, S.Wakabaca, K.Vosailigi, M.Yakalevu; R.Nakiyoyo, R.Viriviri (capt-); I.Lutumaillagi, E.Raturdradra, E.Draniikmate; V.Vatuwaliwali, N.Uluvula; P.Mina.S.Seru, J.Rauto. 

Tucumán: A.Beckwedel; P.Zelarrayán, L.Ferro, C.Imbert, J.Williams; R.Sauze, G.Palau; Molina 
(C.Paz), H.Cabrera. R.Pacheco; J.De Luego R.Forro; P.Sastre, J.Posee, Rodríguez. Fiji: P.Kewa; T.Makutu, K.Yakalevu, J.Ratu, S.Wakabaca; N.Senilagakali, P.P.Waisake; I.Lutumeilagi, E.Retudradra, I.Finau; V.Vatuwalili, I.Cerelala; J.Revouvou, J.Rautu (capt.).M.Tamata. 

San Isidro Club: F.Argerich; M.Walther (capt.), F.Seinz Trápaga, M.Loffreda, L.Corral; R.Madero, F.Aguirre; T.Pétersen, R.Lucka, R.De Vedia; M.Glestra, C.Durlech; F.Insúa, J.Pérez Cabo, C.Seinz Trápaga. Fiji:L.Vuetski; T.Makutu, J.Retu, K, Yakalevu, S.Wakabaca; N.Senilagakali, R.Viriviri (capt.); I.Finau, E.Retudradra, I.Lutumellegi; V.Vatuwaliwali, N.Uluvula; 
J.Revouvou, S.Seru, J.Rauto. 

Cuyo Regional XV: R.Muñiz; R.Herce, F.Ruffo, C.Cipitelli, F.Ruffo; de Cuyo, P.Guarrochena, P.Basile; M.Orrico, C.Quiroga, G.Antonini; D.Veira, S.Fabbi; A.Diez, L.Crivelli, P.Martín. Fiji: P.Kewe; S.Laulau, K.Vosailigi, J.Retu, T.Makutu; Nakiyoyo, P.Waiaake; R.Viriviri, E.Retudradra, Finau, J.Revouvou, Cerelala; S.Navatu, M.Tameta, J.Rauto 

 Santa Fé: Iturraspe; Maggin, Pelosso, Riestra, Sossman; Del Sastre, Petter; Gallo, Milano, Gozarelli; Melano, Patrizzi Dalla Fontaa, Ruiz Diez (Della Torre), Benitez.(Riestra).  Fiji: L.Vueteki; S.Wagabaca, S.Lallau, K.Vakelevu, K.Vasailagi; Nekiyoyo, P.Waisake; I. Lutumailagi, Finau I.; I.Cerelala, J.Revouvou; S.Novatu, M.Tamata, J.Rauto, V.Vatuwaliwali.

References

  Memorias de la UAR 1980

Fiji rugby union tour
Fiji national rugby union team tours
Rugby union tours of Argentina
tour
tour